Charles Pavese (30 October 1890 – 14 March 1967) was a French racing cyclist. He rode in the 1920 Tour de France.

References

1890 births
1967 deaths
French male cyclists
Place of birth missing